Felicity Finch (born 14 March 1955) is a British actress, known for her Northumberland-accented portrayal of Ruth Archer in The Archers on BBC Radio 4.

Early life
Felicity Finch was born in the London Borough of Southwark and grew up in Eaglescliffe, Co. Durham. She has three brothers, born in 1953, 1957 and 1960. Felicity attended Grangefield School (now The Grangefield Academy) in Stockton-on-Tees.  She trained at the London Drama Centre (Drama Centre London).

Career
She has worked as an actress on TV dramas. She presented Something Understood on Radio 4 in Oct 2007  and July 2014. She joined The Archers in 1987 and has played Ruth Archer (née Pritchard) since then.

Finch has also worked as a voice-over artist and reported for Woman's Hour, also on Radio 4. In August 2012 she hosted the Radio 4 Appeal for Health Poverty Action.

See also
 Judy Bentinck, wife of Tim Bentinck

References

External links
 Ruth Archer
 The Archers
 Made of Steel August 2010
 

1955 births
Living people
Actors from County Durham
Alumni of the Drama Centre London
English radio actresses
English soap opera actresses
English television actresses
People from Eaglescliffe
People from the London Borough of Southwark
20th-century English actresses
21st-century English actresses